Giorgos Papandreou (born 12 February 1969) is a retired Greek footballer who played for several teams in Greek Super League (Kavala, Paniliakos, Athinaikos, Ethnikos Asteras and Kalamata) and Cypriot First Division (Digenis Morphou and APOEL). He also played for years in Beta Ethniki and Gamma Ethniki. He was a powerful striker.

References

1969 births
Living people
Super League Greece players
Cypriot First Division players
APOEL FC players
Paniliakos F.C. players
A.O. Charavgiakos players
Digenis Akritas Morphou FC players
Kalamata F.C. players
Kavala F.C. players
Athinaikos F.C. players
Ethnikos Asteras F.C. players
Ethnikos Piraeus F.C. players
Doxa Drama F.C. players
Olympiakos Nicosia players
Greek expatriate footballers
Expatriate footballers in Cyprus
Greek expatriate sportspeople in Cyprus
Association football forwards
Footballers from Athens
Greek footballers